There are 76 universities in Spain, most of which are supported by state funding. 24 Spanish universities are private, of which 7 are affiliated with the Catholic Church.

Former degrees were:
Licenciatura or ingeniería, can last four, five or six years.
Diplomatura or ingeniería técnica, degree courses of shorter duration, 3 years.

Under the new European Higher Education Area, these former undergraduate degrees are being replaced by the título de grado (Bachelor's degree) or the título de máster (Master's degree).

History

The origins of higher education in Spain date back to Al-Andalus, the period of Islamic rule. Madrasahs were established in the Andalusian cities of Córdoba, Seville, Toledo, Granada (Madrasah of Granada), Murcia, Almería, Valencia and Cádiz during the Caliphate of Córdoba.

Problems of definition make it difficult to date the origins of universities. The first medieval European universities were simply groups of scholars, the word "university" being derived from the Latin universitas, meaning corporation.  Nonetheless, the University of Palencia appears to have been the first high education institution in Spain, while the University of Salamanca (Universidad de Salamanca) is the oldest existing Spanish university.  Founded in 1218, during a period of expansion that had begun in the 11th century, this University is considered to be one of the oldest in Western Europe.  The university was founded as a "General School of the kingdom" by King Alfonso IX of León in 1218 so that the Leonese people could study at home without having to leave for Castile.

The reign of Ferdinand, King of Aragon, and Isabella I, Queen of Castile, saw a professionalisation of the apparatus of government in Spain, which led to a demand for men of letters (letrados) who were university graduates (licenciados), of Salamanca, Valladolid and Alcalá de Henares.  These men staffed the various councils of state, including, eventually, the Consejo de Indias and Casa de Contratacion, the two highest bodies in metropolitan Spain for the government of the Spanish Empire in the New World.

Many of the medieval universities in Western Europe were born under the aegis of the Catholic Church, usually as cathedral schools or by papal bull as Studia Generali.  In the early medieval period, most new universities were founded from pre-existing schools, usually when these schools were deemed to have become primarily sites of higher education.  Many historians state that universities and cathedral schools were a continuation of the interest in learning promoted by monasteries.

In Europe, young men proceeded to university when they had completed their study of the trivium–the preparatory arts of grammar, rhetoric, and logic–and the quadrivium: arithmetic, geometry, music, and astronomy. (See degrees of Oxford University for the history of how the trivium and quadrivium developed in relation to degrees, especially in anglophone universities).

Several of the world's oldest universities are located in Spain or were founded by Spanish scholars across the world at the time of the Spanish Empire.

The University of Salamanca, founded by King Alfonso IX of Leon in 1218 is the world's 8th oldest university. The oldest existing universities both in Asia (University of Santo Tomas) and the Americas (University of Santo Domingo) were founded by Spanish religious orders in the 16th century.

The creation of the Spanish Empire brought a significant expansion in royal positions for university-trained lawyer-bureaucrats who were not nobles and were dependent on and loyal to the crown. The multiple royal councils needed university-trained men, as did royal government in the Indies.  These were men who had studied Roman Law. "The law schools of universities were the training ground of the Crown's advisers." The first medieval European universities were simply groups of scholars, the word "university" being derived from the Latin universitas, meaning corporation. The University of Palencia appears to have been the first high education institution in Spain and the third in the world, after Bologna and Oxford, while the University of Salamanca is the oldest existing Spanish university. Founded in 1218, during a period of expansion that had begun in the 11th century, Salamanca is considered to be the third oldest in Western Europe. The university was founded as a "General School of the kingdom" by Alfonso IX in 1218 so that the Leonese people could study at home without having to leave for Castile.

From the Imperial School to St. Bartholomew's College or Our Lady of Mount Zion, the Spanish set up a solid educational system as well as one of the first prominent fee-paying schools in Europe. Stonyhurst College in Lancashire, was one of the many English boarding schools founded by Spanish Jesuits under the Empire, and was originally established in the Spanish Netherlands in 1593. The aim of these schools was to provide English boys with a Roman Catholic education during the rule of Elizabeth I.

High-ranking army men and senior administrators of the empire usually pursued a rigorous education for their sons in Spain. The aim was to continue producing future leaders to serve the Spanish Empire and its interests, often resulting in a well-developed final product of colonial governors. Most of these schools were established by Catholic orders such as the Jesuits, with the intention of emphasizing catholic values at heart, since the Catholic Church was arguably the greatest promoter of the Spanish Empire.

Admission

Admission to the Spanish university system is determined by the nota de corte (literally, "cutoff grade") that is achieved at the end of the two-year Bachillerato, an optional course that students can take from the age of 16 when the period of obligatory secondary education (Educación Secundaria Obligatoria, or ESO) comes to an end.  A number between 1 and 10, the nota de corte is a combination of the grade achieved from the Bachillerato exams which the students take at school, and the average grade (nota de media) obtained from the university selection exam (commonly known as la Selectividad but officially named "Prueba de Acceso a la Universidad" or PAU) that the students will take at the local university. International students need a visa to study in Spain.

The most popular courses at public universities demand the highest nota de corte, while for private universities cost is normally the factor that determines which course a student will follow (that is, the most popular courses are inevitably the most expensive).

Ranking 
There are several rankings for Spanish Universities. The best known ones are the Shanghai Jiao Tong, QS and THE Ranking. These are international rankings, however, there are also some national rankings comprising the "50 carreras" (50 degrees) from the "El Mundo" newspaper, the CSIC or the IAIF ranking of the UCM.

Spain's Higher Educations system has been ranked top-5th by the Spanish CSIC only after the United States, Germany, the United Kingdom and Canada.

National Rankings

U-Ranking 2020 

It was published in 2020 and done by the Banco Bilbao Vizcaya Argentaria and Instituto Valenciano de Investigaciones Económicas.

50 Carreras (El Mundo) 

It is a well known ranking in Spain and it is published every year by the national newspaper "El Mundo".

{| class="wikitable sortable"
|- bgColor="#efefef"
|- bgColor="#efefef"
| width="100" align="center" | 2019 Ranking 
| width="400" align="center" | University
|-
| width="100" align="center" | 1 
| width="250" align="center" | Universitat Autònoma de Barcelona
|-
| width="100" align="center" | 2
| width="250" align="center" | Universidad Complutense de Madrid
|-
| width="100" align="center" | 3 
| width="250" align="center" | Universidad Autónoma de Madrid
|-
| width="100" align="center" | 4 
| width="250" align="center" | Universitat de Barcelona
|-
| width="100" align="center" | 5 
| width="250" align="center" | Universidad Politécnica de Madrid
|-
| width="100" align="center" | 5
| width="250" align="center" | Universidad Carlos III 
|-
| width="100" align="center" | 6
| width="250" align="center" | Universitat Politècnica de València
|-
| width="100" align="center" | 7-8
| width="250" align="center" | Universidad Politécnica de Cataluña
|-
| width="100" align="center" | 7-8
| width="250" align="center" | Universidad de Navarra
|-
| width="100" align="center" | 9
| width="250" align="center" | Universidad de Sevilla
|-
| width="100" align="center" | 10-11
| width="250" align="center" | Universidad Pompeu Fabra
|-
| width="100" align="center" | 10-11
| width="250" align="center" | Universidad Rey Juan Carlos
|}

International Rankings

The Times Higher Education Ranking
{| class="wikitable sortable"
|- bgColor="#efefef"
|- bgColor="#efefef"
| width="100" align="center" | 2021 Ranking 
| width="400" align="center" | University
|-
| width="100" align="center" | 1 
| width="250" align="center" | Universitat Pompeu Fabra
|-
| width="100" align="center" | 2
| width="250" align="center" | Universitat Autònoma de Barcelona
|-
| width="100" align="center" | 3
| width="250" align="center" | Universitat de Barcelona
|-
| width="100" align="center" | 4
| width="250" align="center" | University of Navarra
|-
| width="100" align="center" | 5
| width="250" align="center" | Autonomous University of Madrid
|-
| width="100" align="center" | 6
| width="250" align="center" | University of Valencia
|-
| width="100" align="center" | 7
| width="250" align="center" | Complutense University of Madrid
|}

QS Ranking 
Published annually since 2004,  QS World University Rankings® is one of the most complete and trusted university ranking in the world.

{| class="wikitable sortable"
|- bgColor="#efefef"
|- bgColor="#efefef"
| width="100" align="center" | 2020 Ranking 
| width="400" align="center" | University
|-
| width="100" align="center" | 1 
| width="250" align="center" | Universitat de Barcelona
|-
| width="100" align="center" | 2
| width="250" align="center" | Universidad Autónoma de Madrid
|-
| width="100" align="center" | 3 
| width="250" align="center" | Universidad Complutense de Madrid
|-
| width="100" align="center" | 4 
| width="250" align="center" | Universitat Autònoma de Barcelona
|-
| width="100" align="center" | 5 
| width="250" align="center" | Universidad de Navarra
|-
| width="100" align="center" | 6
| width="250" align="center" | Universitat Pompeu Fabra
|-
| width="100" align="center" | 7
| width="250" align="center" | Universidad Carlos III de Madrid
|-
| width="100" align="center" | 8
| width="250" align="center" | Universitat Politècnica de Catalunya
|-
| width="100" align="center" | 9
| width="250" align="center" | Universitat Politècnica de València
|}

Shanghai Ranking 

The Academic Ranking of World Universities (ARWU) is first published in June 2003 by the Center for World-Class Universities (CWCU), Graduate School of Education (formerly the Institute of Higher Education) of Shanghai Jiao Tong University, China, and updated on an annual basis. Despite its prestige, many people criticize them because they don't take into account the size of the universities for their rankings.

{| class="wikitable sortable"
|- bgColor="#efefef"
|- bgColor="#efefef"
| width="100" align="center" | 2019 Ranking 
| width="400" align="center" | University
|-
| width="100" align="center" | 1 
| width="250" align="center" | Universitat de Barcelona
|-
| width="100" align="center" | 2-5
| width="250" align="center" | Universitat de València
|-
| width="100" align="center" | 2-5
| width="250" align="center" | Universidad de Granada
|-
| width="100" align="center" | 2-5 
| width="250" align="center" | Universitat Autònoma de Barcelona
|-
| width="100" align="center" | 2-5 
| width="250" align="center" | Universidad Complutense de Madrid
|-
| width="100" align="center" | 6-7
| width="250" align="center" | Universidad Autónoma de Madrid
|-
| width="100" align="center" | 6-7
| width="250" align="center" | Universitat Pompeu Fabra
|}

Round University Ranking 
{| class="wikitable sortable"
|- bgColor="#efefef"
|- bgColor="#efefef"
| width="100" align="center" | 2020 Ranking 
| width="400" align="center" | University
|-
| width="100" align="center" | 1 
| width="250" align="center" | Universitat de Barcelona
|-
| width="100" align="center" | 2
| width="250" align="center" | Autonomous University of Barcelona
|-
| width="100" align="center" | 3 
| width="250" align="center" | Autonomous University of Madrid
|-
| width="100" align="center" | 4 
| width="250" align="center" | Pompeu Fabra University
|-
| width="100" align="center" | 5 
| width="250" align="center" | Universidad de Navarra
|-
| width="100" align="center" | 6
| width="250" align="center" | University of Zaragoza
|-
| width="100" align="center" | 7
| width="250" align="center" | Complutense University of Madrid
|-
| width="100" align="center" | 8
| width="250" align="center" | Universitat Politècnica de Catalunya
|-
| width="100" align="center" | 9
| width="250" align="center" | University of Valencia
|-
| width="100" align="center" | 10
| width="250" align="center" | University of Rovira i Virgili
|}

List of public universities
 Euskal Herriko Unibertsitatea / Universidad del País VascoUniversity of the Basque Country
 Universidad Autónoma de Madrid
 Universidad Carlos III de MadridUC3M
 Universidad Complutense de Madrid
 Universidad de AlcaláUniversidad de Alcalá (UAH) Madrid
 Universidad de AlicanteUniversity of Alicante
 Universidad de Almeria UAL - Universidad de Almería
 Universidad de BurgosUniversidad de Burgos
 Universidad de CádizPortal UCA – Portal principal de la Universidad de Cádiz
 Universidad de CantabriaUniversidad de Cantabria Inicio
 Universidad de Castilla-La ManchaUniversidad de Castilla - La Mancha
 Universidad de CórdobaInicio
 Universidad de Extremadura Portal de la UEX - Bienvenido a la Universidad de Extremadura
 Universidad de GranadaPágina de inicio
 Universidad de Huelva
 Universidad de Jaén Inicio | Universidad de Jaén
 Universidad de La LagunaInicio
 Universidad de La Rioja Universidad de La Rioja
 Universidad de Las Palmas de Gran CanariaULPGC - Universidad de Las Palmas de Gran Canaria
 Universidad de León Inicio | Universidad de León
 Universidad de MálagaHome - University of Malaga
 Universidad de MurciaPágina Principal - Universidad de Murcia
 Universidad de OviedoUniversidad de Oviedo - Inicio
 Universidad de SalamancaUniversidad de Salamanca | Universidad de Salamanca
 Universidad de Sevilla| Portal Universidad de Sevilla
 Universidad de ValladolidUniversidad de Valladolid
 Universidad de ZaragozaInicio | Universidad de Zaragoza
 Universidad Internacional de AndalucíaInicio
 Universidad Internacional Menéndez PelayoUniversidad Internacional Menéndez Pelayo - UIMP
 Universidad Nacional de Educación a DistanciaUNED | Universidad Nacional de Educación a Distancia - Enseñanza Online
 Universidad Pablo de Olavide 
 Universidad Politécnica de Cartagena Universidad Politécnica de Cartagena
 Universidad Politécnica de MadridUniversidad Politécnica de Madrid
 Universidad Pública de NavarraUPNA - Portada - home
 Universidad Rey Juan CarlosInicio - Universidad Rey Juan Carlos
 Universidade da CoruñaUniversidade da Coruña
 Universidade de Santiago de CompostelaInicio | Universidade de Santiago de Compostela
 Universidade de VigoInicio | Universidade de Vigo
 Universitat Autònoma de Barcelona Universitat Autònoma de Barcelona
 Universitat d'Alacant University of Alicante
 Universitat de BarcelonaUniversitat de Barcelona
 Universitat de Girona Universitat de Girona > UdG
 Universitat de les Illes Balears
 Universitat de LleidaInici
 Universitat de València
 Universitat Jaume I de CastellóUniversitat Jaume I
 Universitat Miguel Hernández d'Elx
 Universitat Oberta de Catalunya 
 Universitat Politècnica de Catalunya
 Universitat Politècnica de València
 Universitat Pompeu Fabra
 Universitat Rovira i Virgili

List of private universities
 European University
 Barcelona Technology School
 Graduate School of Management (GSM Barcelona)
 Universidad de Deusto / Deustuko Unibertsitatea
 Mondragon University
 Universidad Alfonso X el Sabio
 Universidad Antonio de Nebrija
 Universidad Camilo José Cela
 Universidad Cardenal Herrera - CEU 
 Universidad Católica de Valencia San Vicente Mártir
 Universidad Católica San Antonio de Murcia 
 Universidad Católica Santa Teresa de Jesús de Ávila 
 Universidad de Navarra
 Universidad Europea de Madrid
 Universidad Europea Miguel de Cervantes 
 Universidad Francisco de Vitoria
 International University of La Rioja
 Universidad Pontificia Comillas
 Universidad Pontificia de Salamanca
 Universidad San Jorge
 Universidad San Pablo-CEU 
 IE University
 Universitat Abat Oliba CEU 
 Universitat de Vic
 Universitat Internacional de Catalunya 
 Universitat Ramon Llull
 Valencian International University

See also
Academic ranks in Spain
ANECA, the accreditation body
Education in Spain
List of universities in Spain (organised by autonomous community)
University
British universities
Dutch universities
French universities 
German universities 
Italian universities 
Portuguese universities 
US universities
Fundación Universidad.es

References

External links 
Top Universities in Spain

Spain